Syria Palaestina, or Roman Palestine, was a Roman province in the Palestine region between the early 2nd and late 4th centuries AD. It resulted from the merging of the province of Judaea with Galilee, in 132 AD, into an enlarged province named "Syria Palaestina". Its capital was Caesarea Maritima.

Background 

Judaea was a Roman province which incorporated the regions of Judea, Samaria, and Idumea, and extended over parts of the former regions of the Hasmonean and Herodian kingdoms of Judea. It was named after Herod Archelaus's Tetrarchy of Judaea, but the Roman province encompassed a much larger territory. The name "Judaea" was derived from the Kingdom of Judah of the 6th century BC.

Following the deposition of Herod Archelaus in 6 AD, Judea came under direct Roman rule, during which time the Roman governor was given authority to punish by execution. The general population also began to be taxed by Rome. However, Jewish leaders retained broad discretion over affairs within Judaism. The Herodian kingdom was split into tetrarchies in 6 AD, and they were gradually absorbed into Roman provinces, with Roman Syria annexing Iturea and Trachonitis. The capital of the Judaea province was shifted from Jerusalem to Caesarea Maritima, which, according to historian H. H. Ben-Sasson, had been the "administrative capital" of the region beginning in 6 AD.

History

During the 1st and 2nd centuries, Judaea became the epicenter of a series of unsuccessful large-scale Jewish rebellions against Rome, known as the Jewish-Roman Wars. The Roman suppression of these revolts led to wide-scale destruction, a very high toll of life and enslavement. The First Jewish-Roman War (66-73) resulted in the destruction of Jerusalem and the Second Temple. Two generations later, the Bar Kokhba Revolt (132-136 ) erupted. Judea's countryside was devastated, and many were killed, displaced or sold into slavery. Jewish presence in the region significantly dwindled after the failure of the Bar Kokhba revolt. Following the suppression of the Bar Kokhba revolt, Jerusalem was rebuilt as a Roman colony under the name of Aelia Capitolina, and the province of Judea was renamed Syria Palaestina.

The province retained its capital, Caesarea Maritima, and therefore remained distinct from the province of Syria located further north with its capital in Antioch. Jerusalem, which held special religious significance for the Jews, was rebuilt as a Roman colony named Aelia Capitolina. Jews were forbidden to settle there or in the immediate vicinity. While Syria was divided into several smaller provinces by Septimius Severus and later again by Diocletian, Syria Palaestina survived into late antiquity. Presumably it was small enough not to become dangerous as a potential starting point for usurpations. Instead, Diocletian even integrated parts of the province of Arabia into the province, namely the Negev and the Sinai Peninsula. He moved the Legio X Fretensis from Jerusalem to Aila (today's Eilat/Aqaba) to secure the country against Arab incursions. The part of the Roman imperial border that now ran through Palestine was subsequently placed under its own supreme commander, the Dux Palaestinae, who is known from the Notitia Dignitatum. The border wall, the Limes Palaestinae, which had existed for some time, was pushed further south.

In the 3rd century, Syria Palaestina experienced the crisis that spread throughout the empire, but the 4th century brought an economic upswing due the Christianization of the Roman Empire and the associated upswing in Christian pilgrimage to the "Holy Land". In the course of late antiquity, with imperial support, Christianity succeeded in asserting itself against Judaism in almost the entire region. The province was split into smaller provinces during the 4th and 5th centuries. In 358, areas that had formerly belonged to Arabia were transformed into a separate province of Palaestina Salutaris, with Petra as its capital. The remaining territory was named Palaestina Prima. Around the year 400, it had been further split into a smaller Palaestina Prima and Palaestina Secunda. Palaestina Prima included the heartland with the capital Caesarea, while Palaestina Secunda extended to Galilee, the Golan and parts of the Transjordan, and its capital was Scythopolis (today Bet She'an). Salutaris was named Tertia or Salutaris.

Name 

The name Syria-Palaestina was given to the Roman province of Judaea in the early 2nd century AD. The renaming is often presented as having been performed by Roman Emperor Hadrian in the wake of the 132-135 AD Bar Kokhba revolt, though no evidence exists as to exactly when the name change was implemented or by whom, the name "Palestina" to the whole region had been used by the Greeks for centuries and by then, and the renaming may even have taken place at an earlier date. While the previous term bore an ethnic connotation to Jews, the new term had a strict geographical meaning.

Some scholars suggest it was enacted to "disassociate the Jewish people from their historical homeland" or as a "punishment" for the Bar Kokhba revolt, and identify Hadrian as the one responsible. Other scholars disagree; some suggested that the name was justified as the new province was far larger than geographical Judea, and as the name of Syria Palaestina was already in use for at least five centuries by the time the Bar Kokhba revolt took place.

Despite this naming, Palestine was independent of Syria, even to a greater extent than before, since instead of a legatus Augusti pro praetore, a higher-ranking governor of consular rank now presided over the region. This in turn was probably due to the fact that in addition to the already existing legion in Caesarea, a second legion was stationed in Legio, increasing the military importance of the province. Exactly when the legion was moved and the rank of the governor's post increased is a matter of debate - in any case, these events must have occurred before the governorship of Quintus Tineius Rufus, who took office no later than 130.

Demographics 
The population of Syria-Palaestina was of mixed character. In 300 AD, Jews formed around a quarter of the population and lived in compact settlements in Galilee, while Samaritans were concentrated in Samaria. By the fifth century, Christianity had gained further ground among the population and Christians formed a majority in Palestine and Jerusalem.

Religion

Roman cult 
After the Jewish–Roman wars (66–135), which Epiphanius believed the Cenacle survived, the significance of Jerusalem to Christians entered a period of decline, Jerusalem having been temporarily converted to the pagan Aelia Capitolina, but interest resumed again with the pilgrimage of Helena (the mother of Constantine the Great) to the Holy Land c. 326–28.

New pagan cities were founded in Judea at Eleutheropolis (Bayt Jibrin), Diopolis (Lydd), and Nicopolis (Emmaus).

Early Christianity 
The Romans destroyed the Jewish community of the Church in Jerusalem, which had existed since the time of Jesus. Traditionally it is believed the Jerusalem Christians waited out the Jewish–Roman wars in Pella in the Decapolis.

The line of Jewish bishops in Jerusalem, which is claimed to have started with Jesus's brother James the Righteous as its first bishop, ceased to exist within the Empire. Hans Kung in "Islam: Past Present and Future", suggests that the Jewish Christians sought refuge in Arabia and he quotes with approval Clemen et al.:
"This produces the paradox of truly historic significance that while Jewish Christianity was swallowed up in the Christian church, it preserved itself in Islam."

Christianity was practiced in secret and the Hellenization of Palaestina continued under Septimius Severus (193–211 AD).

Reorganization 
In circa 390, Syria Palaestina was reorganised into several administrative units: Palaestina Prima, Palaestina Secunda, and Palaestina Tertia (in the 6th century), Syria Prima and Phoenice and Phoenice Lebanensis. All were included within the larger Eastern Roman (Byzantine) Diocese of the East, together with the provinces of Isauria, Cilicia, Cyprus (until 536), Euphratensis, Mesopotamia, Osroene, and Arabia Petraea.

Palaestina Prima consisted of Judea, Samaria, the Paralia, and Peraea, with the governor residing in Caesarea. Palaestina Secunda consisted of the Galilee, the lower Jezreel Valley, the regions east of Galilee, and the western part of the former Decapolis, with the seat of government at Scythopolis. Palaestina Tertia included the Negev, southern Transjordan part of Arabia, and most of Sinai, with Petra as the usual residence of the governor. Palestina Tertia was also known as Palaestina Salutaris.

See also 
 Roman Judaea
 Aelia Capitolina
 Shaam

References

Notes

Citations

Sources

Further reading 

 
 
 Nicole Belayche, "Foundation myths in Roman Palestine. Traditions and reworking", in Ton Derks, Nico Roymans (ed.), Ethnic Constructs in Antiquity: The Role of Power and Tradition (Amsterdam, Amsterdam University Press, 2009) (Amsterdam Archaeological Studies, 13), 167-188.

External links 

 Two legates and a procurator of Syria Palaestina Zeitschrift für Papyrologie und Epigraphik, 1977

135 establishments
130s establishments in the Roman Empire
3rd century in the Roman Empire
390 disestablishments
390s disestablishments in the Roman Empire
4th century in the Roman Empire
Ancient history of Jordan
Ancient Near East
Bar Kokhba revolt
Classical Palestine
Historical regions
Israel in the Roman era
Judea
Jews and Judaism in the Roman Empire
Jordan in the Roman era
Provinces of the Roman Empire
Political entities in the Land of Israel
Syria (region)
Palestine (region)
State of Palestine in the Roman era
States and territories established in the 2nd century
States and territories disestablished in the 4th century
Syria Palaestina